Rip It Up is a compilation release featuring tracks from the Vee-Jay Records vaults. All of the tracks had been previously available.

Track listing
Lucille       
Tutti Frutti       
Jenny Jenny       
Good Golly Miss Molly       
Slippin & Slidin       
Girl Can't Help It       
Keep A-knockin       
Lawdy Miss Clawdy       
Short Fat Fanny       
Baby Face       
Ooh! My Soul       
Hound Dog       
Whole Lotta Shakin Goin On       
Blueberry Hill       
Money Honey       
Send Me Some Lovin       
Goodnight Irene       
Rip It Up       
Dance What You Wanna

Charts
Album

References

1973 compilation albums
Little Richard albums